This is a list of the busiest airports in Ukraine.

In graph

2019

2018

2017

2016

2015

2014

2013

2012

2011

2010

See also 
 List of airports in Ukraine
 List of the busiest airports in Europe
 Transport in Ukraine
 List of the busiest airports in the former USSR

Notes

References

 busy
Ua